The 2008 CHA Men's Ice Hockey Tournament was played between March 14 and March 16, 2008 at Dwyer Arena in Lewiston, New York. By winning the tournament, Niagara received College Hockey America's automatic bid to the 2008 NCAA Division I Men's Ice Hockey Tournament.

Format
The tournament featured three rounds of play. In the first round, the fourth and fifth ranked seeds, Wayne State and Alabama-Huntsville, played for entry into the semifinals, to which the top three seeds received byes. The winners of the two semifinal games then played for the championship on March 16, 2008, with the winner receiving an automatic bid to the 2008 NCAA Division I Men's Ice Hockey Tournament.

Conference standings
Note: GP = Games played; W = Wins; L = Losses; T = Ties; PTS = Points; GF = Goals For; GA = Goals Against

Bracket

Quarterfinal

(4) Wayne State vs. (5) Alabama-Huntsville

Semifinals

(1) Bemidji State vs. (4) Wayne State

(2) Niagara vs. (3) Robert Morris

Championship

(1) Bemidji State vs. (2) Niagara

Tournament awards

All-Star team
Goaltender: Juliano Pagliero (Niagara)
Defensemen: Cody Bostock (Bemidji State), Dan Sullivan (Niagara)
Forwards: Chris Margott (Robert Morris), Kyle Rogers (Niagara), Tyler Scofield (Bemidji State)

MVP
Ted Cook (Niagara)

References

External links
Official tournament website

CHA Men's Ice Hockey Tournament
Cha Men's Ice Hockey Tournament
College sports tournaments in New York (state)
Ice hockey competitions in New York (state)
Lewiston (town), New York
2008 in sports in New York (state)